The 2016 Hull City Council election took place on 5 May 2016 to elect members of Hull City Council in England. This was on the same day as other nationwide local elections. One third of the council was up for election with Labour defending overall control of the council. The Green Party did not field any candidates after the local party failed to submit nomination papers in time.

This result had the following consequences for the total number of seats on the Council after the elections:

Ward results
No elections were held in Bransholme East, Bransholme West and University wards.

Avenue

Beverley

Boothferry

Bricknell

Derringham

Drypool

Holderness

Ings

Kings Park

Longhill

Marfleet

Myton

Newington

Newland

Orchard Park and Greenwood

Pickering

Southcoates East

Southcoates West

St Andrews

Sutton

References

2016 English local elections
2016
2010s in Kingston upon Hull